Inglewood, also known as the Robert Gray House, is a historic home located near Harrisonburg, Rockingham County, Virginia. It was built between 1849 and 1851, and is a two-story, five-bay, double pile brick Georgian style dwelling.  It has a side gable roof and interior end chimneys.  The house was restored in the 1940s.  Also on the property are a contributing two-story, three-bay rectangular frame cabin, reportedly used as a schoolhouse, and a mid- to late 19th-century creamery.

It was listed on the National Register of Historic Places in 1985.

References

Houses on the National Register of Historic Places in Virginia
Georgian architecture in Virginia
Houses completed in 1851
Houses in Rockingham County, Virginia
National Register of Historic Places in Rockingham County, Virginia
1851 establishments in Virginia